The Junkers L55 was Junkers' first V-12 engine, appearing in 1927 and based on a pair of six-cylinder L5s. In 1928 a supercharger was added.  It was used in one or two Junkers aircraft in their early development but was replaced by the geared L88 geared V-12 of 1929.

Design and development
The most widely used of Junkers' series of six-cylinder inline four-stroke aircraft engines  was the L5, first run in 1922.  This engine was used in 1927 as the basis of the 665 hp L55, which had two banks of six cylinders aligned at 60°.  These banks had the same bore, stroke, camshaft operated twin pairs of valves per cylinder, watercooling etc. as the L5, driving new a common crankshaft in a revised crankcase. A supercharger was added after a year to improve high altitude power.

Operational history
The L55 is only known to have powered two aircraft for certain, the Junkers G 38 early in its career and the Junkers A 32. The first G 38 originally had two L55s inboard plus two L8 engines. The high altitude research Junkers Ju 49 may have used the L55 at the start of its flight programme. The L55 was rapidly replaced by the L88 in both the G 38 and Ju 49.

Applications
Junkers A 32
Junkers G 38
Junkers Ju 49, possibly

Specifications

See also

References

Bibliography

L55
1920s aircraft piston engines